Amodio may refer to:

Amedeo Amodio, Italian choreographer
Florent Amodio, French figure skater
Héctor Amodio, Uruguayan guerrilla fighter
Matt Amodio, Jeopardy! player
Nicolás Amodio, Uruguayan footballer
Paolo Amodio, Luxembourgian footballer
Roberto Amodio, Italian Director of football and former footballer 
Nick Amodio, Famous American Pool Player